Vernon Carkeek (13 February 1893 – 28 December 1968) was an Australian rules footballer who played with Collingwood in the Victorian Football League (VFL).

Carkeek, who played originally for Hawthorn in the VFA, made three appearances for Collingwood, two in 1915 and one in 1916.

In the 1922 VFL season, he officiated in a single game as a boundary umpire.

References

1893 births
Australian rules footballers from Victoria (Australia)
Collingwood Football Club players
Hawthorn Football Club (VFA) players
Australian Football League umpires
1968 deaths